NATO reporting name/Air Standardization Coordinating Committee (ASCC) names for miscellaneous aircraft, with Soviet designations, sorted by reporting name:

 "Madcap" Antonov An-71
 "Madge" Beriev Be-6
 "Maestro" Yakovlev Yak-28U
 "Magnet" Yakovlev Yak-17UTI
 "Magnum" Yakovlev Yak-30
 "Maiden" Sukhoi Su-9U
 "Mail" Beriev Be-12
 "Mainstay" Beriev A-50 (Airborne Early Warning (AEW) version of the Ilyushin Il-76)
 "Mallow" Beriev Be-10
 "Mandrake" Yakovlev Yak-25RV
 "Mangrove" Yakovlev Yak-27R
 "Mantis" Yakovlev Yak-32
 "Mare" Yakovlev Yak-14
 "Mark" Yakovlev Yak-7V
 "Mascot" Ilyushin Il-28U
 "Max" Yakovlev Yak-18
 "Maxdome" Ilyushin Il-80
 "May" Ilyushin Il-38
 "Maya" Aero L-29
 "Mermaid" Beriev Be-40
 "Midas" Ilyushin Il-78
 "Midget" Mikoyan-Gurevich MiG-15UTI
 "Mink" Yakovlev UT-2
 "Mist" Tsybin Ts-25
 "Mitten" Yakovlev Yak-130
 "Mole" Beriev Be-8
 "Mongol" Mikoyan-Gurevich MiG-21 two-seat trainer version
 "Moose" Yakovlev Yak-11
 "Mop" PBY Catalina
 "Moss" Tupolev Tu-126
 "Mote" Beriev MBR-2
 "Moujik" Sukhoi Su-7U
 "Mug" Beriev Be-4
 "Mule" Po-2 (U-2)
 "Mystic" Myasishchev M-17/M-55

NATO reporting name/ASCC names for miscellaneous aircraft, with Soviet designations, sorted by Soviet designation:

 Aero L-29 "Maya"
 Antonov An-71 "Madcap"
 Beriev A-50 "Mainstay"
 Beriev Be-2 "Mote"
 Beriev Be-4 "Mug"
 Beriev Be-6 "Madge"
 Beriev Be-8 "Mole"
 Beriev Be-10 "Mallow"
 Beriev Be-12 "Mail"
 Beriev Be-40 "Mermaid"
 Beriev MBR-2 "Mote"
 Ilyushin Il-28U "Mascot"
 Ilyushin Il-38 "May"
 Ilyushin Il-78 "Midas"
 Ilyushin Il-86VKP "Maxdome"
 Myasishchev M-17/M-55 "Mystic"
 Mikoyan-Gurevich MiG-15UTI "Midget"
 Mikoyan-Gurevich MiG-21 "Mongol" two-seat trainer version
 PBY Catalina "Mop"
 Po-2 (U-2) "Mule"
 Sukhoi Su-7U "Moujik"
 Sukhoi Su-9U "Maiden"
 Tsibyn Ts-25 "Mist"
 Tupolev Tu-126 "Moss"
 Yakovlev UT-2 "Mink"
 Yakovlev Yak-7V "Mark"
 Yakovlev Yak-11 "Moose"
 Yakovlev Yak-14 "Mare"
 Yakovlev Yak-17UTI "Magnet"
 Yakovlev Yak-18 "Max"
 Yakovlev Yak-28U "Maestro"
 Yakovlev Yak-25RV "Mandrake"
 Yakovlev Yak-27R "Mangrove"
 Yakovlev Yak-30 "Magnum"
 Yakovlev Yak-32 "Mantis"
 Yakovlev Yak-130 "Mitten"

See also
NATO reporting name

miscellaneous aircraft
NATO reporting names for miscellaneous aircraft, List of